Chilperic (also Chilpéric or Chilperich) can refer to: 

Chilperic I, king of Neustria
Chilperic II, king of the Franks
Chilperic I of Burgundy
Chilperic II of Burgundy
Chilpéric (operetta), an opéra bouffe by Hervé